The 302nd Infantry Brigade was a headquarters formed by the British Army towards the end of the Second World War.

By the end of 1944, 21st Army Group was suffering a severe manpower shortage, particularly among the infantry. In January 1945, the War Office began to reorganise surplus anti-aircraft and coastal artillery regiments in the UK into infantry battalions, primarily for line of communication and occupation duties in North West Europe, thereby releasing trained infantry for frontline service. The 302nd brigade was formed on 15 January 1945 as one of a proposed eight brigade headquarters organised to command these new units. However, no brigade commander was appointed and no units were posted to the brigade, which was disbanded on 7 March 1945.

Notes

References
 Lionel Ellis, "History of the Second World War: United Kingdom Military Series: Victory in the West", Volume II: "The Defeat of Germany", London: HMSO, 1968/Uckfield: Naval & Military, 2004, .

External sources
 The Royal Artillery 1939–45

Military units and formations established in 1945
Infantry brigades of the British Army in World War II
Military units and formations disestablished in 1945